Aroma is a town located in Kassala State, Sudan. Aroma is north of Kassala State's capital, Kassala. In 2016, Aroma suffered from water shortage, while Kassala State witnessed a severe bread shortage.

References

Populated places in Kassala (state)